Sir William Wiseman, 1st Baronet (c 1629 - 1688) of Rivenhall Place, Rivenhall End, Essex was an English landowner and politician who sat in the House of Commons between 1677 and 1685.

Wiseman was the son of Sir Thomas Wiseman of Rivenhall, Essex, and his wife Elizabeth Sedley daughter of Sir Isaac Sedley, 1st Baronet of Great Chart, Kent. He succeeded to Rivenhall Place on the death of his father in 1659.

He was appointed High Sheriff of Essex for the remainder of 1659–60 in place of his father, who had died in office. He was  created a baronet on 15 June 1660 and knighted on 24 June 1660.

In 1677, he was elected Member of Parliament for Maldon in a by-election to the Cavalier Parliament. He was re-elected MP for Maldon in the two elections of 1679 and again in 1681.

Wiseman died in London, at the age of about 58 and was buried in London on 14 June 1688, when the Baronetcy became extinct. He had married before 1664, Elizabeth Mansel, daughter of Sir Lewis Mansel, 2nd Baronet of Margam and his third wife  Elizabeth Montagu, daughter of Henry Montagu, Earl of Manchester. Rivenhall Place was sold by his widow and brother to the Western family.

References

1629 births
1688 deaths
People from Braintree District
English landowners
Baronets in the Baronetage of England
Knights Bachelor
High Sheriffs of Essex
Members of Parliament for Maldon
English MPs 1661–1679
English MPs 1679
English MPs 1680–1681
English MPs 1681